The 1989 Prix de l'Arc de Triomphe was a horse race held at Longchamp on Sunday 8 October 1989. It was the 68th running of the Prix de l'Arc de Triomphe.

The winner was Carroll House, a four-year-old colt trained in Great Britain by Michael Jarvis. The winning jockey was Michael Kinane.

Race details
 Sponsor: CIGA Hotels
 Purse: 8,500,000 F; First prize: 5,000,000 F
 Going: Good to Soft
 Distance: 2,400 metres
 Number of runners: 19
 Winner's time: 2m 30.8s

Full result

 Abbreviations: hd = head; snk = short-neck; nk = neck

Winner's details
Further details of the winner, Carroll House.
 Sex: Colt
 Foaled: 5 March 1985
 Country: Ireland
 Sire: Lord Gayle; Dam: Tuna (Silver Shark)
 Owner: Antonio Balzarini
 Breeder: Mrs Peter Clarke

References

External links
 Colour Chart – Arc 1989

Prix de l'Arc de Triomphe
 1989
1989 in Paris
October 1989 sports events in Europe